Jaco Van Niekerk is an ex-South African Rugby League footballer.

Career
Niekerk represented South Africa at the 1995 World Cup and participated in two matches.

References

Living people
South African rugby league players
South Africa national rugby league team players
Rugby league props
Place of birth missing (living people)
Date of birth missing (living people)
Year of birth missing (living people)